The 2001 Troy State Trojans football team represented Troy State University—now known as Troy University—as an independent during the 2001 NCAA Division I-A football season. Led by 11th-year head coach Larry Blakeney, the Trojans compiled a record of 7–4. This was Troy State's first season competing at the NCAA Division I-A level after eight seasons at the NCAA Division I-AA level. The team played home games at Veterans Memorial Stadium in Troy, Alabama.

Schedule

References

Troy State
Troy Trojans football seasons
Troy State Trojans football